Al Johnson is an American former Negro league pitcher who played in the 1930s.

Johnson played for the Washington Elite Giants in 1936. In four recorded appearances on the mound, he posted a 10.80 ERA over 13.1 innings.

References

External links
Baseball statistics and player information from Baseball-Reference Black Baseball Stats and Seamheads

Year of birth missing
Place of birth missing
Washington Elite Giants players